Joseph Lin may refer to:
 Joseph Lin (violinist)
 Joseph Lin (basketball)